The Women's African Volleyball Clubs Cup Winners was a competition for volleyball clubs in Africa organised by the African Volleyball Confederation Gather the African teams that have won their national Cups In a tournament held since 1989 but dissolved later.

Results

Winners by club

Winners by country

Notes

External links
 Panapress Official
 CAVB Official website

International volleyball competitions
International women's volleyball competitions
African international sports competitions
Recurring sporting events established in 1989